29th Street is a side platformed Sacramento RT light rail station in the Midtown neighborhood of Sacramento, California, United States. The station was opened on September 5, 1987, and is operated by the Sacramento Regional Transit District. It is served by the Gold Line. The station is located on R Street between 29th and 30th Streets, below the overpass of Business Loop 80 (Capital City Freeway), and is the easternmost station in the Central City Fare Zone. Portions of the Poverty Ridge neighborhood are also accessible from the station.

Platforms and Tracks

References

Sacramento Regional Transit light rail stations
Railway stations in the United States opened in 1987